Anthology is a compilation by Asia highlighting the John Payne era up to 1997.  Re-recordings of John Wetton-era material were prompted by a lawsuit filed by Wetton when the original versions were used on the initial release in Japan.  New versions were allowed, as well as a cover of the GTR track, "The Hunter".

Track listing 
 The Hunter (Downes)
 Only Time Will Tell (Wetton, Downes)
 Arena (Downes, Payne)
 Anytime (Downes, Payne)
 Don't Cry (Wetton, Downes)
 Aqua Part One (Downes, Payne, Howe)
 Who Will Stop The Rain? (Downes, Warman, Woolfenden)
 The Heat Goes On (Wetton, Downes)
 Two Sides Of The Moon (Downes, Payne) 
 Reality (Downes, Payne)
 Go (Wetton, Downes)
 Feels Like Love (Downes, Payne)
 Someday (Downes, Warman)
 Heat Of The Moment (Wetton, Downes)
 Military Man (Downes, Payne)
 Different Worlds (Downes, Payne)
 Time Again [acoustic] (Downes, Wetton, Howe, Palmer) - bonus track

Credits 
Asia :
Geoffrey Downes : Keyboards (1-17), Backing Vocals (2,14)
John Payne : Bass (1-16), Vocals (1-5,7-17), Guitars (1,4-5,11,14-17)
Michael Sturgis : Drums (1-5,7-16), Percussion (2,14)

Guest musicians :
Elliot Randall : Guitars (2-3,9)
Al Pitrelli : Guitar (4,7,10,12-13,15)
Steve Howe : Guitar (6,7,13)
Aziz Ibrahim : Guitar (8-9,11)

References 

Albums produced by John Payne (singer)
Asia (band) albums
Albums produced by Geoff Downes
1997 compilation albums
Inside Out Music compilation albums
Snapper Music compilation albums